Ardo Rennik (26 June 1947 – 14 February 2009) was an Estonian figure skater and coach.

He was born in Tallinn. In 1970 he graduated from Lesgaft National State University of Physical Education, Sport and Health.

He started his skating exercising in 1955, coached by Ly Piir. In 1964 he won Estonian Championships in pair skating (with Julia Pavina-Rennik). 1973–1978 he has won 6 Russian SFSR Championships (with Julia Pavina-Rennik).

References

1947 births
2009 deaths
Estonian male pair skaters
Estonian sports coaches
Figure skaters from Tallinn